Russkoye Bogatstvo (Russian Wealth) was a monthly literary and political magazine published in St. Petersburg, Russia, from 1876 to mid-1918. In the early 1890s it served as an organ of the liberal Narodniks. From 1906 it became an organ of the Popular Socialists.

References

1876 establishments in the Russian Empire
1918 disestablishments in Russia
Defunct magazines published in Russia
Defunct political magazines
Magazines established in 1876
Magazines disestablished in 1918
Magazines published in Saint Petersburg
Russian-language magazines
Monthly magazines published in Russia
Political magazines published in Russia